The 2013 season was Club de Regatas Vasco da Gama's 115th year in existence, the club's 98th season in existence of football, and the club's 42nd season playing in the Brasileirão Série A, the top flight of Brazilian football.

The club could not play in the Copa Sudamericana due to fixture conflicts with the Copa do Brasil.

Players

Current squad

Squad information 

As of 31 July 2013.

from Vasco da Gama (U–20) (ables to play in first team) 

As of 31 July 2013.

Reserve players (Vasco da Gama B)

Out on loan 

As of 31 July 2013.

Transfer summary

In

Loan In

On Trial (In)

Out

Loan Out

On Trial (Out)

Club

Coaching staff

Facilities

Official sponsors 
 CAIXA (since July 2013)
 Nissan (since July 2013)
 LG (since July 2013)
 Penalty
 Brazil Foodservice Group
 Eletrobras (until June 2013)
 Fresh Juices (until June 2013)
 Brahma
 TIM

Match results

Preseason

Pedrinho's farewell 
Vasco da Gama's only preseason friendly in 2013 was against Ajax. The friendly was the last match of Pedrinho, one of Vasco da Gama's revered players.

Rio de Janeiro State Championship

Guanabara Cup

Guanabara Cup group stage matches

Guanabara Cup knockout stage matches

Rio Cup

Rio Cup group stage matches

Brasileirão Série A

Brasileirão Série A results summary

Brasileirão Série A results by round

Brasileirão Série A matches results

Copa do Brasil

Copa do Brasil matches

Friendlies

Squad statistics

Appearances and goals 
Last updated on 8 December 2013.
Players in italics have left the club during the season.

|-
|colspan="14"|Youth academy's players who participated during the season: (Statistics shown are the appearances made and goals scored while at Vasco da Gama first squad)

|-
|colspan="14"|Players who left the club during the season: (Statistics shown are the appearances made and goals scored while at Vasco da Gama)

|}

Goalkeeper statistics 

{| border="1" cellpadding="4" cellspacing="0" style="margin: 1em 1em 1em 1em 0; background: #f9f9f9; border: 1px #aaa solid; border-collapse: collapse; font-size: 95%; text-align: center;"
|-
| rowspan="2" style="width:1%; text-align:center;"  |No.
| rowspan="2" style="width:70px; text-align:center;"|Nat.
| rowspan="2" style="width:40.5%; text-align:center;" |Player
| colspan="3" style="text-align:center;"|Total
| colspan="3" style="text-align:center;"|Brasileirão Série A
| colspan="3" style="text-align:center;"|Copa do Brasil
| colspan="3" style="text-align:center;"|Rio de Janeiro State Championship
|-
|PLD
|GA
|GAA
|PLD
|GA
|GAA
|PLD
|GA
|GAA
|PLD
|GA
|GAA
|-
| style="text-align: right;" |1
|
| style="text-align: left;" |Michel Alves
|11+1
|22
|1.83
|8
|17
|2.12
|1
|2
|2.00
|2+1
|3
|1.00
|-
| style="text-align: right;" |12
|
| style="text-align: left;" |Alessandro
|24
|34
|1.41
|8
|12
|1.50
|1
|2
|2.00
|15
|20
|1.33
|-
| style="text-align: right;" |25
|
| style="text-align: left;" |Diogo Silva
|24
|33
|1.37
|22
|32
|1.45
|2
|1
|0.50
|0
|0
|0.00
|-

Italic: denotes player is no longer with team

Top scorers 
{| class="wikitable" style="font-size: 95%; text-align: center;"
|-
!width=15 style="background:#000000; color:white; text-align:center;"|
!width=15 style="background:#000000; color:white; text-align:center;"|
!width=15 style="background:#000000; color:white; text-align:center;"|
!width=15 style="background:#000000; color:white; text-align:center;"|
!width=226 style="background:#000000; color:white; text-align:center;"|Name
!width=130 style="background:#000000; color:white; text-align:center;"|Brasileirão Série A
!width=110 style="background:#000000; color:white; text-align:center;"|Copa do Brasil
!width=150 style="background:#000000; color:white; text-align:center;"|Rio de Janeiro State Championship
!width=80 style="background:#000000; color:white; text-align:center;"|Total
|-
|1
|9
|FW
|
|André
|12
|0
|0
|12
|-
|2
|19
|FW
|
|Edmilson
|8
|1
|0
|9
|-
|3
|31
|MF
|
|Bernardo
|1
|0
|7
|8
|-
|rowspan=2|4
|11
|FW
|
|Carlos Tenorio
|2
|2
|2
|6
|-
|93
|FW
|
|Willie
|5
|1
|0
|6
|-
|6
|87
|MF
|
|Dakson
|2
|1
|2
|5
|-
|rowspan=4|7
|8/10
|MF
|
|Pedro Ken
|3
|0
|1
|4
|-
|10
|MF
|
|Carlos Alberto
|1
|0
|3
|4
|-
|26
|DF
|
|Dedé
|0
|0
|4
|4
|-
|30
|MF
|
|Marlone
|3
|1
|0
|4
|-
|rowspan=2|11
|18
|DF
|
|Rafael Vaz
|3
|0
|0
|3
|-
|39
|FW
|
|Thalles
|1
|2
|0
|3
|-
|rowspan=2|13
|7
|FW
|
|Éder Luís
|0
|0
|2
|2
|-
|8
|MF
|
|Juninho Pernambucano
|2
|0
|0
|2
|-
|rowspan=9|15
|13
|DF
|
|Cris
|1
|0
|0
|1
|-
|13
|DF
|
|André Ribeiro
|0
|0
|1
|1
|-
|20
|FW
|
|Romário
|0
|0
|1
|1
|-
|21
|MF
|
|Fellipe Bastos
|1
|0
|0
|1
|-
|22
|FW
|
|Abuda
|1
|0
|0
|1
|-
|27
|MF
|
|Alisson
|1
|0
|0
|1
|-
|28
|DF
|
|Jomar
|1
|0
|0
|1
|-
|9/29
|FW
|
|Leonardo
|0
|0
|1
|1
|-
|97
|FW
|
|Thiaguinho
|0
|0
|1
|1
|-
|colspan=4|Own goals
|
|2
|0
|1
|3
|-
|colspan="4"|
! style="background:#000000; color:white; text-align:center;"|TOTALS
! style="background:#000000; color:white; text-align:center;"|50
! style="background:#000000; color:white; text-align:center;"|8
! style="background:#000000; color:white; text-align:center;"|26
! style="background:#000000; color:white; text-align:center;"|86
|-

Italic: denotes no longer with club.

Top assists 

{| class="wikitable" style="font-size: 95%; text-align: center;"
|-
!width=15 style="background:#000000; color:white; text-align:center;"|
!width=15 style="background:#000000; color:white; text-align:center;"|
!width=15 style="background:#000000; color:white; text-align:center;"|
!width=15 style="background:#000000; color:white; text-align:center;"|
!width=226 style="background:#000000; color:white; text-align:center;"|Name
!width=130 style="background:#000000; color:white; text-align:center;"|Brasileirão Série A
!width=110 style="background:#000000; color:white; text-align:center;"|Copa do Brasil
!width=150 style="background:#000000; color:white; text-align:center;"|Rio de Janeiro State Championship
!width=80 style="background:#000000; color:white; text-align:center;"|Total
|-
|1
|30
|MF
|
|Marlone
|5
|1
|0
|6
|-
|rowspan=7|2
|6
|DF
|
|Yoshimar Yotún
|2
|2
|0
|4
|-
|7
|FW
|
|Éder Luís
|0
|0
|4
|4
|-
|8
|MF
|
|Juninho Pernambucano
|4
|0
|0
|4
|-
|8/10
|MF
|
|Pedro Ken
|2
|0
|2
|4
|-
|23
|DF
|
|Fagner
|3
|1
|0
|4
|-
|31
|MF
|
|Bernardo
|0
|0
|4
|4
|-
|87
|MF
|
|Dakson
|2
|0
|2
|4
|-
|rowspan=5|9
|11
|FW
|
|Carlos Tenorio
|1
|0
|1
|2
|-
|5/15
|MF
|
|Fillipe Soutto
|1
|1
|0
|2
|-
|17
|MF
|
|Wendel
|2
|0
|0
|2
|-
|19
|FW
|
|Edmilson
|2
|0
|0
|2
|-
|97
|FW
|
|Thiaguinho
|0
|0
|2
|2
|-
|rowspan=11|14
|2
|DF
|
|Elsinho
|1
|0
|0
|1
|-
|13
|DF
|
|Cris
|1
|0
|0
|1
|-
|14
|DF
|
|Luan
|1
|0
|0
|1
|-
|22
|MF
|
|Abuda
|0
|0
|1
|1
|-
|27
|MF
|
|Alisson
|1
|0
|0
|1
|-
|9/29
|FW
|
|Leonardo
|0
|0
|1
|1
|-
|29
|MF
|
|Jhon Cley
|1
|0
|0
|1
|-
|38
|MF
|
|Fábio Lima
|0
|1
|0
|1
|-
|41
|FW
|
|Robinho
|1
|0
|0
|1
|-
|84
|MF
|
|Sandro Silva
|0
|1
|0
|1
|-
|93
|FW
|
|Willie
|1
|0
|0
|1
|-
|colspan="4"|
! style="background:#000000; color:white; text-align:center;"|TOTALS
! style="background:#000000; color:white; text-align:center;"|31
! style="background:#000000; color:white; text-align:center;"|7
! style="background:#000000; color:white; text-align:center;"|17
! style="background:#000000; color:white; text-align:center;"|55

Those in italics are no longer with club.

Clean sheets 
This list includes all competitive matches and is sorted by shirt number when total clean sheets are equal.

{| class="wikitable" style="font-size: 95%; text-align: center;"
|-
!width=15 style="background:#000000; color:white; text-align:center;"| 
!width=15 style="background:#000000; color:white; text-align:center;"| 
!width=15 style="background:#000000; color:white; text-align:center;"|
!width=15 style="background:#000000; color:white; text-align:center;"|
!width=226 style="background:#000000; color:white; text-align:center;"|Name
!width=130 style="background:#000000; color:white; text-align:center;"|Brasileirão Série A
!width=110 style="background:#000000; color:white; text-align:center;"|Copa do Brasil
!width=150 style="background:#000000; color:white; text-align:center;"|Rio de Janeiro State Championship
!width=80 style="background:#000000; color:white; text-align:center;"|Total
|-
|1
|25
|GK
|
|Diogo Silva
|5
|1
|0
|6
|-
|2
|12
|GK
|
|Alessandro
|2
|0
|3
|5
|-
|3
|1
|GK
|
|Michel Alves
|1
|0
|0
|1
|-
|colspan="4"|
! style="background:#000000; color:white; text-align:center;"|TOTALS
! style="background:#000000; color:white; text-align:center;"|8
! style="background:#000000; color:white; text-align:center;"|1
! style="background:#000000; color:white; text-align:center;"|3
! style="background:#000000; color:white; text-align:center;"|12

Those in italics are no longer with club.

Disciplinary record 
{| class="wikitable" style="font-size: 95%; text-align: center;"
|-
| rowspan="2"  style="width:2.5%;background:#000000; text-align:center; color:white;"|
| rowspan="2"  style="width:3%;background:#000000; text-align:center; color:white;"|
| rowspan="2"  style="width:3%;background:#000000; text-align:center; color:white;"|
| rowspan="2"  style="width:3%;background:#000000; text-align:center; color:white;"|
| rowspan="2"  style="width:15%;background:#000000; text-align:center; color:white;"|Name
| colspan="3" style="text-align:center;background:#000000; color:white;"|Brasileirão Série A
| colspan="3" style="text-align:center;background:#000000; color:white;"|Copa do Brasil
| colspan="3" style="text-align:center;background:#000000; color:white;"|Rio de Janeiro State Championship
| colspan="3" style="text-align:center;background:#000000; color:white;"|Total
|-
!  style="width:25px; background:#fe9;"|
!  style="width:28px; background:#ff8888;"|
!  style="width:25px; background:#ff8888;"|
!  style="width:25px; background:#fe9;"|
!  style="width:28px; background:#ff8888;"|
!  style="width:25px; background:#ff8888;"|
!  style="width:25px; background:#fe9;"|
!  style="width:28px; background:#ff8888;"|
!  style="width:25px; background:#ff8888;"|
!  style="width:25px; background:#fe9;"|
!  style="width:28px; background:#ff8888;"|
!  style="width:25px; background:#ff8888;"|
|-
|rowspan=2|1
|8/10
|MF
|
|Pedro Ken
|7
|0
|0
|1
|0
|0
|1
|0
|0
|9
|0
|0
|-
|17
|MF
|
|Wendel
|6
|0
|0
|0
|0
|0
|3
|0
|0
|9
|0
|0
|-
|rowspan=2|3
|8
|MF
|
|Juninho Pernambucano
|7
|0
|0
|0
|0
|0
|0
|0
|0
|7
|0
|0
|-
|9
|FW
|
|André
|7
|0
|0
|0
|0
|0
|0
|0
|0
|7
|0
|0
|-
|rowspan=5|5
|6
|DF
|
|Yoshimar Yotún
|6
|0
|0
|0
|0
|0
|0
|0
|0
|6
|0
|0
|-
|22
|MF
|
|Abuda
|5
|0
|0
|0
|0
|0
|1
|0
|0
|6
|0
|0
|-
|23
|DF
|
|Fagner
|5
|0
|0
|1
|0
|0
|0
|0
|0
|6
|0
|0
|-
|33
|DF
|
|Renato Silva
|4
|0
|0
|0
|0
|0
|2
|0
|0
|6
|0
|0
|-
|84
|MF
|
|Sandro Silva
|3
|0
|0
|1
|0
|0
|2
|0
|0
|6
|0
|0
|-
|rowspan=2|10
|4
|DF
|
|Nei
|2
|1
|0
|0
|0
|0
|2
|0
|0
|4
|1
|0
|-
|10
|MF
|
|Carlos Alberto
|1
|0
|0
|0
|0
|0
|4
|0
|0
|5
|0
|0
|-
|rowspan=3|12
|5/15
|MF
|
|Fillipe Soutto
|2
|0
|0
|1
|0
|0
|1
|0
|0
|4
|0
|0
|-
|28
|DF
|
|Jomar
|4
|0
|0
|0
|0
|0
|0
|0
|0
|4
|0
|0
|-
|87
|MF
|
|Dakson
|1
|0
|0
|0
|0
|0
|3
|0
|0
|4
|0
|0
|-
|rowspan=6|15
|2
|DF
|
|Elsinho
|2
|0
|0
|0
|0
|0
|1
|0
|0
|3
|0
|0
|-
|5
|MF
|
|Pablo Guiñazú
|3
|0
|0
|0
|0
|0
|0
|0
|0
|3
|0
|0
|-
|13
|DF
|
|Cris
|2
|0
|0
|1
|0
|0
|0
|0
|0
|3
|0
|0
|-
|14
|DF
|
|Luan
|3
|0
|0
|0
|0
|0
|0
|0
|0
|3
|0
|0
|-
|18
|DF
|
|Rafael Vaz
|3
|0
|0
|0
|0
|0
|0
|0
|0
|3
|0
|0
|-
|21
|MF
|
|Fellipe Bastos
|1
|0
|0
|0
|0
|0
|2
|0
|0
|3
|0
|0
|-
|rowspan=11|21
|7
|FW
|
|Éder Luís
|0
|0
|0
|0
|0
|0
|2
|0
|0
|2
|0
|0
|-
|11
|FW
|
|Carlos Tenorio
|1
|0
|0
|0
|0
|0
|1
|0
|0
|2
|0
|0
|-
|13
|DF
|
|André Ribeiro
|0
|0
|0
|0
|0
|0
|2
|0
|0
|2
|0
|0
|-
|19
|FW
|
|Edmilson
|2
|0
|0
|0
|0
|0
|0
|0
|0
|2
|0
|0
|-
|20
|MF
|
|Santiago Montoya Muñoz
|1
|0
|0
|1
|0
|0
|0
|0
|0
|2
|0
|0
|-
|25
|GK
|
|Diogo Silva
|2
|0
|0
|0
|0
|0
|0
|0
|0
|2
|0
|0
|-
|26
|DF
|
|Dedé
|0
|0
|0
|0
|0
|0
|2
|0
|0
|2
|0
|0
|-
|27
|MF
|
|Alisson
|2
|0
|0
|0
|0
|0
|0
|0
|0
|2
|0
|0
|-
|29
|MF
|
|Jhon Cley
|1
|0
|0
|0
|0
|0
|1
|0
|0
|2
|0
|0
|-
|31
|MF
|
|Bernardo
|0
|0
|0
|0
|0
|0
|2
|0
|0
|2
|0
|0
|-
|37
|DF
|
|Henrique
|2
|0
|0
|0
|0
|0
|0
|0
|0
|2
|0
|0
|-
|rowspan=10|32
|12
|GK
|
|Alessandro
|0
|0
|0
|0
|0
|0
|0
|0
|1
|0
|0
|1
|-
|16
|MF
|
|Francismar
|1
|0
|0
|0
|0
|0
|0
|0
|0
|1
|0
|0
|-
|18
|DF
|
|Thiago Feltri
|0
|0
|0
|0
|0
|0
|1
|0
|0
|1
|0
|0
|-
|20
|FW
|
|Romário
|0
|0
|0
|0
|0
|0
|1
|0
|0
|1
|0
|0
|-
|30
|MF
|
|Marlone
|1
|0
|0
|0
|0
|0
|0
|0
|0
|1
|0
|0
|-
|35
|MF
|
|Baiano
|1
|0
|0
|0
|0
|0
|0
|0
|0
|1
|0
|0
|-
|38
|MF
|
|Fábio Lima
|0
|0
|0
|1
|0
|0
|0
|0
|0
|1
|0
|0
|-
|41
|FW
|
|Robinho
|1
|0
|0
|0
|0
|0
|0
|0
|0
|1
|0
|0
|-
|91
|FW
|
|Reginaldo
|1
|0
|0
|0
|0
|0
|0
|0
|0
|1
|0
|0
|-
|93
|FW
|
|Willie
|0
|1
|0
|0
|0
|0
|0
|0
|0
|0
|1
|0
|-
|colspan="4"|
! style="background:#000000; color:white; text-align:center;"|TOTALS
! style="background:#000000; color:white; text-align:center;"|90
! style="background:#000000; color:white; text-align:center;"|2
! style="background:#000000; color:white; text-align:center;"|0
! style="background:#000000; color:white; text-align:center;"|7
! style="background:#000000; color:white; text-align:center;"|0
! style="background:#000000; color:white; text-align:center;"|0
! style="background:#000000; color:white; text-align:center;"|34
! style="background:#000000; color:white; text-align:center;"|0
! style="background:#000000; color:white; text-align:center;"|1
! style="background:#000000; color:white; text-align:center;"|131
! style="background:#000000; color:white; text-align:center;"|2
! style="background:#000000; color:white; text-align:center;"|1

Those in italics are no longer with the club.

Captains 
Accounts for all competitions. Last updated on 8 December 2013.

Team statistics 
{| class="wikitable" style="text-align: center;"
|-
! style="background:#000000; color:white; text-align:center;"| !! style="background:#000000; color:white; text-align:center;"|Total !! style="background:#000000; color:white; text-align:center;"|Home !! style="background:#000000; color:white; text-align:center;"|Away !! style="background:#000000; color:white; text-align:center;"|Classics
|-
|align=left| Games played || 10 || 3 || 3 || 4
|-
|align=left| Games won    || 6 || 2 || 3 || 1
|-
|align=left| Games drawn  || 1 || 0 || 0 || 1
|-
|align=left| Games lost   || 3 || 1 || 0 || 2
|-
|align=left| Biggest win  || Boavista v 0-3 || 4-2 v Macaé || Boavista v 0-3 || 3-2 v Fluminense
|-
|align=left| Biggest loss || 2-4 v Flamengo || 0-1 v Bangu || n/a || 2-4 v Flamengo
|-
|align=left| Biggest win (League) || n/a || n/a || n/a || n/a
|-
|align=left| Biggest win (Cup) || n/a || n/a || n/a || n/a
|-
|align=left| Biggest win (State League) || Boavista v 0-3 || 4-2 v Macaé || Boavista v 0-3 || 3-2 v Fluminense
|-
|align=left| Biggest loss (League) || n/a || n/a || n/a || n/a
|-
|align=left| Biggest loss (Cup) || n/a || n/a || n/a || n/a
|-
|align=left| Biggest loss (State League) || 2-4 v Flamengo || 0-1 v Bangu || n/a || 2-4 v Flamengo
|-
|align=left| Clean sheets || 2 || 1 || 1 || 0
|-
|align=left| Goals scored || 21 || 6 || 9 || 6
|-
|align=left| Goals conceded || 14 || 3 || 3 || 8
|-
|align=left| Goal difference || +7 || +3 || +6 || -2
|-
|-
|-
|align=left| Yellow cards || 22 || 5 || 3 || 14
|-
|align=left| Red cards || 0 || 0 || 0 || 0
|-
|align=left| Most appearances || || || || 
|-
|align=left| Top scorer || Bernardo (7) || Carlos Alberto (2) || Bernardo (5) || BernardoDaksonDedéPedro Ken (1)Romário
|-
|align=left |Worst discipline ||  ||  ||  || 
|-
|align=left|Penalties for || 1/1 || 1/1 || 0/0 || 0/0
|-
|align=left|Penalties against || 1/1 || 1/1 || 0/0 || 0/0
|-
|align=left| Points (League) ||  ||  || || 
|-
|align=left| Points rate || 63,3% || 67% || 100% || 33,3%
|-

International call-ups

Starting eleven 
All competitions.

See also 

 2013 Rio de Janeiro State Championship
 2013 Brasileirão Série A
 2013 Copa do Brasil

References 

CR Vasco da Gama
Club de Regatas Vasco da Gama seasons
Vasco da Gama